South Carolina Highway 125 (SC 125) is a  primary state highway in the U.S. state of South Carolina. The highway serves as a direct route between Allendale and Augusta, Georgia, through the Savannah River Site (SRS); and an alternate to U.S. Route 278 (US 278).

Route description
Beginning in downtown Allendale, it is also known as the Augusta Highway and travels northeast to Martin before entering Barnwell County. Soon after entering Barnwell County is the Savannah River Site, which is limited to through traffic only. After a  drive, and well into Aiken County, travelers exit the Savannah River Site and enter the town of Jackson. Continuing north, on what is now called Atomic Road, SC 125 joins a concurrency with US 278 from Beech Island to Clearwater. Entering North Augusta, it crosses Interstate 520 (I-520) without an interchange and connects with US 25 before the road ends at Buena Vista Avenue. Going west on Buena Vista Avenue, it meets US 25 Business at Georgia Avenue where it ends,  from Augusta.

Savannah River Site

SC 125 is the only highway through which the public is allowed to travel through the Savannah River Site. However, for the  stretch it travels through SRS, vehicles are prohibited from stopping except for emergencies. Mile-markers going north to south help travelers count the miles before they are out of the restricted area. The highway is flanked with trees and fences and, on occasion, defunct roads crossing the highway with gates restricting access; the biggest being the former SC 64 interchange near mile marker 8.

Prior to 2006, checkpoints were located at both ends of SC 125.  When arriving at the entrance checkpoint, drivers would receive a pass and may also have their car searched at that time. Drivers were required to return the pass at the exit checkpoint; for those that drove too quickly to the other end would be issued a speeding ticket.  Drivers that failed to either return the pass or arrive later than expected could be withheld for further questioning by authorities. After 2006, the checkpoints were removed along route, though checkpoints still exist at some roads that go deeper into the Savannah River Site.

History
The highway was originally established around 1938 as a new primary routing from US 1/US 78 in Hamburg to US 25 in North Augusta. In 1953, SC 125 was rerouted onto Atomic Road and extended south along new four-lane primary routing to Beech Island, connecting with SC 28; then continuing south, through Jackson, to the Savannah River Site, ending at the gate.  In 1965, US 278 was overlapped between Clearwater to Beech Island.  Between 1968 and 1970, SC 125 was extended southeast again through the Savannah River Site, ending at its current southern terminus in Allendale; SC 125 replaced what was SC 28 prior to 1951 and replaced part of SC 641, north of Allendale.

Major intersections

Special routes

North Augusta connector route

South Carolina Highway 125 Connector (SC 125 Conn.) is a  connector route that is unsigned. It travels completely within the southwestern part of Aiken County. Its entire length is within the southern part of North Augusta.

The connector begins at an intersection with the southbound lanes of U.S. Route 1 (US 1), which is also the westbound lanes of US 78/US 278 (Jefferson Davis Highway). There is no access from Jefferson Davis Highway north to East Buena Vista Avenue or vice versa. SC 125 Conn. travels to the northwest and immediately curves to the west-northwest. At an intersection with US 25/SC 121 (East Martintown Road), it turns right onto those highways and travels concurrently with them to the north-northwest. It takes the next left, onto another segment of East Buena Vista Avenue, and travels to the west-southwest. Immediately, it curves to the northwest. Just after an intersection with the western terminus of Floyd Street, it resumes its west-northwest direction. It then meets its northern terminus, an intersection with the SC 125 mainline (known as East Buena Vista Avenue west of here and Atomic Road north of here).

North Augusta truck route

South Carolina Highway 125 Truck (SC 125 Truck) is a  truck route of SC 125 that travels completely within the southwestern part of Aiken County. Its entire length is within the southern part of North Augusta.

The truck route begins at an intersection with US 25/SC 121 (East Martintown Road). This intersection is also the eastern terminus of SC 230. US 25, SC 121, SC 125 Truck, and SC 230 travel concurrently to the northwest. The roadway is a retail corridor with many businesses along its path. At an intersection with Knox Avenue, US 25/SC 121 split off to the north, while SC 125 Truck and SC 230 continue to the northwest on East Martintown Road. Approximately  later, they intersect US 25 Business (US 25 Bus.; Georgia Avenue). Here, SC 125 Truck turns left onto the business route to the southwest, while SC 230 continues to the northwest. At the southern terminus of Carolina Avenue, US 25 Bus. and SC 125 Truck curves to the south-southwest. At an intersection with the northern terminus of SC 125 (Buena Vista Avenue), the truck route ends, and US 25 Bus. continues to the south-southwest.

See also

References

External links

 
 Mapmikey's South Carolina Highways Page: SC 125

125
Transportation in Allendale County, South Carolina
Transportation in Barnwell County, South Carolina
Transportation in Aiken County, South Carolina